Flat Rock is a residential neighborhood located in Columbus, Georgia. In it is Flat Rock Park.

Columbus metropolitan area, Georgia
Neighborhoods in Columbus, Georgia